Gretchen Walsh (born January 29, 2003) is a competitive American swimmer. She holds two world junior records in mixed gender relay events as well as American records in the 50 yard freestyle, 100 yard backstroke, 4×50 yard freestyle relay, 4×50 yard medley relay, 4×100 yard freestyle relay, and 4×100 yard medley relay. In 2022, she became the fastest female freshman to swim the 50 yard freestyle in the NCAA, with a time of 20.95 seconds, and earned the NCAA title in the 100 yard freestyle, with a time of 46.05 seconds. In 2023, she won the women's NCAA Division I title in the 100 yard backstroke, with an American record time of 48.26 seconds, and the 100 yard freestyle, with a 45.61. She won six gold medals at the 2019 World Junior Championships as well as five gold medals and one silver medal at the 2018 Junior Pan Pacific Swimming Championships. She competes collegiately for the University of Virginia.

Early life and education
Walsh was born January 29, 2003, to mother Glynis Walsh and father Robert Walsh. She has an older sister, Alexandra, who is also a competitive swimmer. She attended Harpeth Hall School in Nashville, Tennessee, where she competed scholastically for the high school team including setting national high school records in the 50 yard freestyle and the 100 yard freestyle as well as winning state championships titles in multiple events.

In the autumn of 2021, Walsh started attending the University of Virginia where she competes collegiately as part of the Virginia Cavaliers swimming and diving team.

Career

2015–2016
In 2015, Walsh caught the attention of SwimSwam after achieving her first spot at a national competition for juniors when she was 12 years old.

2016 US Olympic Trials
Walsh became the youngest swimmer to qualify for the 2016 US Olympic Trials in 2016. In addition to being the youngest qualifier, at just 13 years of age, she was also the youngest swimmer to compete at the Olympic Trials, where she was 13 years, 4 months, and 13 days old at the time of competition. In the one event she qualified to compete in, the 50 meter freestyle, Walsh finished with a time of 26.55 seconds and placed 125th overall.

2017–2018
In December 2017, Walsh broke her own National Age Group record in the 50 yard freestyle for the girls 13–14 age group with a time of 22.00 seconds in the final of the event at the Speedo Junior Nationals East Championships in Knoxville. Four months later, in March 2018 and when she was 15 years old, Walsh became the youngest female American swimmer to swim the 50 yard freestyle race in less than 22.00 seconds with a time of 21.85 seconds that also broke the former National Age Group records in the event for the girls 15–16 age group set by both Simone Manuel and Kate Douglass at 22.04 on different dates.

2018 Junior Pan Pacific Championships
Carrying this record-breaking momentum to the 2018 Junior Pan Pacific Swimming Championships in Suva, Fiji, Walsh won the gold medal and broke the Championships record in the 100 meter freestyle on the first night of competition with a time of 54.47 seconds, which lowered the previous Championships record of 54.60 seconds set by Simone Manuel in 2012 by over one tenth of a second. In addition to this first gold medal, Walsh won gold medals in the 4×100 meter medley relay, 4×100 meter mixed medley relay, 4×100 meter freestyle relay, and the 4×200 meter freestyle relay, a silver medal in the 50 meter freestyle, and placed 12th in the 200 meter freestyle and 16th in the 100 meter butterfly.

2019
Competing as part of the Nashville Aquatic Club at the 2019 Speedo Southern Premier Meet in Knoxville, Walsh broke the girls 15–16 age group National Age Group record of 47.73 seconds in the 100 yard freestyle set in 2013 by Simone Manuel with a time of 47.49 seconds. In May 2019 SwimSwam ranked Walsh as the number one NCAA recruit from all swimmers across the United States in the high school graduating class of 2021.

2019 World Junior Championships

Ahead of the start of competition at the 2019 World Junior Championships held at Danube Arena in Budapest, Hungary in August, Walsh was named as one of the five captains for the United States contingent of swimmers at the Championships by USA Swimming. On the second day of competition, August 21, Walsh won her first medal, a gold medal in the 4×100 meter mixed medley relay, swimming the freestyle leg of the relay in 53.60 seconds and helping the relay set new world junior and Championships records in the event with a time of 3:44.84. The next day she won her first individual medal of the competition, a gold medal in the 100 meter freestyle with a time of 53.74 seconds. She won her third gold medal later the same day, this time swimming the fourth leg of the 4×100 meter mixed freestyle relay in a time of 53.83 seconds to contribute to the relay's winning time of 3:25.92, which was also a new world junior record and Championships record for the event. Two days later, on August 24, Walsh won a gold medal in the 4×100 meter freestyle relay, splitting a time of 54.13 seconds for the lead-off leg of the relay to help the relay achieve the winning mark of 3:37.61. On August 25, the final day of competition, Walsh brought her total medal count to six gold medals by winning a gold medal in the 50 meter freestyle in a time of 24.71 seconds as well as winning a gold medal in the 4×100 meter medley relay with a finals relay time of 3:59.13.

2020
Starting the year off, Walsh announced in January her verbal commitment to compete collegiately for the University of Virginia Cavaliers starting in autumn of 2021. On February 7, Walsh set a new overall National High School record in the 50 yard freestyle in 21.59 seconds, which broke the former record of 21.64 seconds set in 2015 by Abbey Weitzeil. The next day, Walsh became the fastest female swimmer in American high school swimming history in the 100 yard freestyle with a time of 46.98 seconds, breaking the former overall National High School record in the event set in 2015 by Abbey Weitzeil at 47.09 seconds. Later in the year, in November at the 2020 U.S. Open Swimming Championships, she won the gold medal in the 50 meter freestyle with a time of 24.65 seconds and the silver medal in the 100 meter freestyle with a 54.37.

2020 US Olympic Trials
At the 2020 US Olympic Trials in Omaha, Nebraska, which were postponed to 2021 due to the COVID-19 pandemic, Walsh started competing on the first day of the second wave of the competition, swimming a time of 27.02 seconds in the 50 meter butterfly en route to her final mark of 58.58 in the prelims heats of the 100 meter butterfly, which ranked her eighth heading into the semifinals. In the semifinals of the 100 meter butterfly, Walsh swam a time of 58.46 seconds, ranked twelfth overall, and did not advance to the final of the event. For her second event of the trials, the 100 meter freestyle, Walsh placed 28th in the prelims heats with a time of 55.91 seconds. In her third and final event of the 2020 Olympic Trials, Walsh swam a personal best time of 24.64 seconds in the semifinals stage of competition of the 50 meter freestyle, which ranked her sixth overall ahead of the final. Walsh swam a 24.74 in the final of the event, placing fifth overall, and not making the 2020 US Olympic Team.

2021–2022: First collegiate season
In one of the first dual meets of her collegiate career, Walsh helped her school's team, the Virginia Cavaliers, win against the California Golden Bears, winning four individual events, including the 100 yard backstroke in 51.15 seconds, and swimming on two relays. Her performances contributed to collegiate swimming being ranked number one for "The Week That Was" honor from Swimming World for the week of October 18, 2021. Walsh was also named as the "Women's Swimmer of the Week" by the Atlantic Coast Conference, ACC, for the week of October 19, 2021. Later in the month, at a dual meet between her school and Army, Walsh won the 200 yard freestyle. In January 2022, Walsh split a 23.04 for the lead-off leg of the 4×50 medley relay in a dual meet against North Carolina State University, becoming the fastest female American swimmer in the 50 yard backstroke. At a practice later in the month, Walsh kicked 100 yards without a kickboard and with flip turns in approximately 55 seconds.

2022 ACC Championships
In her first race of the 2022 Atlantic Coast Conference, ACC, Championships in February 2022, Walsh tied Kate Douglass for a new ACC record in the 50 yard freestyle with a 21.25 in the prelims heats. With her time of 21.25 seconds, Walsh also became the fastest female freshman swimmer in the history of the NCAA in the 50 yard freestyle, edging out former fastest female freshman, Simone Manuel in 2015, by 0.07 seconds. In the final of the 4×50 yard freestyle relay in the evening, she split a 20.58 on the fourth leg to help achieve a first-place finish in an American record time of 1:24.47. Walsh swam a 21.04 in the final of the 50 yard freestyle to become the fourth-fastest woman ever to swim the event in the NCAA, behind Abbey Weitzeil, Kate Douglass, and Erika Brown, and place second. Day three, Walsh helped set another American record, this time in the 4×50 medley relay, with a new record time of 1:31.81 to win the event. Her split time of 22.82 for the backstroke leg of the relay was the fastest 50 yard backstroke time by a female swimmer in the NCAA. The following morning, she ranked third in the prelims heats of the 100 yard backstroke in 51.53, qualifying for the final. In the evening, she placed second with a time of 50.13 seconds, which was 0.72 seconds behind first-place finisher Katharine Berkoff. She followed up her individual performance with a split of 49.71 on the backstroke leg of the 4×100 yard medley relay, helping set new American and US Open records in the event at 3:22.34. Her time of 49.71 seconds was a personal best time and moved her up in rankings to sixth-fastest female swimmer in the event.

Starting off her competition on the fifth and final day, Walsh qualified for the final of the 100 yard freestyle with a time of 47.07 seconds, which ranked her second overall in the prelims heats. In the final, she swam a personal best time of 46.86 seconds to take second-place. Finishing off the meet, she anchored the 4×100 yard freestyle relay with a 46.35, helping win in an ACC record time of 3:08.22.

2022 NCAA Championships

Day one of the 2022 NCAA Championships in March, Walsh helped achieve a win in the 4×50 yard medley relay in a Championships record time of 1:32.16, splitting a 22.81 for the backstroke leg of the relay. In the morning prelims heats on day two, she ranked second in the 50 yard freestyle with a time of 21.09 seconds and qualified for the final. She swam a personal best time of 20.95 seconds in the final, placing second. Later in the same finals session, she helped achieve a first-place victory in the 4×50 yard freestyle relay, splitting a 20.58 for the anchor leg of the relay. The third morning, she qualified for the final of the 100 yard backstroke tied in rank for second with a time of 49.93 seconds. In the evening, she placed second in the 100 yard backstroke with a personal best time of 49.00 seconds, finishing 0.26 seconds behind first-place finisher Katharine Berkoff. For the 4×100 yard medley relay in the same session, she helped win in a time of 3:22.34, which tied the American and US Open records in the event, splitting a 49.44 for backstroke leg of the relay.

On the fourth and final day, Walsh ranked first in the prelims heats of the 100 yard freestyle, qualifying for the final with a time of 46.78 seconds. In the final, she won the NCAA title in the event, set a new pool record, and ranked as the fourth-fastest all-time in the 100 yard freestyle with a new personal best time of 46.05 seconds. She concluded her first NCAA Championships with another win, this time helping set new American and US Open records in the 4×100 yard freestyle relay in 3:06.91, splitting a 26.01 for the anchor leg of the relay.

2022 International Team Trials
Walsh ranked 22nd in the preliminary heats of the 100 meter freestyle on day one of the 2022 US International Team Trials in Greensboro, North Carolina, in April, not advancing to the final with her time of 55.57 seconds. The following day, she tied for fourth-rank in the prelims heats of the 50 meter butterfly with a personal best time of 25.98 seconds, advancing to the evening final. She placed fourth in the final with a personal best time of 25.97 seconds. On day three, she qualified for the final of the 50 meter backstroke ranking eighth in the prelims heats with a personal best time of 28.26 seconds. Lowering her personal best time to a 27.78 in the final, she placed fifth. Day four, she ranked 15th in the prelims heats of the 100 meter backstroke, qualifying for the b-final with a 1:01.25. She decided not to compete the event in the b-final. In her final event, the 50 meter freestyle on the fifth and final day, she ranked sixth in the prelims heats with a 24.88 and qualified for the final. She placed third in the final with a personal best time of 24.53 seconds, just 0.03 seconds behind the first-place finisher. Three months later, she lowered her personal best time in the 50 meter freestyle again, this time to a 24.47, at the 2022 US National Championships and took second-place.

2022–2023: Second collegiate season
At the 2022 Tennessee Invitational in Knoxville in November, Walsh won the 50 yard freestyle with a personal best time of 20.94 seconds. She also achieved a personal best time of 49.89 seconds in the 100 yard butterfly in the preliminaries in the event. In early February 2023, she achieved a second-place finish in the 200 yard freestyle at the season's Cavalier Invitational with a personal best time of 1:43.24, which was 0.46 seconds behind first-place finisher and teammate Aimee Canny.

2023 ACC Championships
The first night of the 2023 Atlantic Coast Conference Championships in Greensboro, North Carolina, Walsh led-off with a personal best time of 22.65 seconds for the backstroke portion of the 4×50 yard medley relay to help win the conference title in an American, US Open, and NCAA record time of 1:31.73. In her first final of the evening session the following day, she split a 20.48 for the second leg of the 4×50 yard freestyle relay, helping set new American, US Open, and NCAA records with a time of 1:23.87. Later in the session, she set new American, US Open, and NCAA records in the 50 yard freestyle with a time of 20.83 seconds, lowering the former marks by 0.01 seconds from the 20.84 set by Kate Douglass in 2022 and winning the conference title. It marked her first American record in an individual event. It was also her first conference title in an individual event.

On the third evening, Walsh finished in a personal best time of 49.34 seconds in the final of the 100 yard butterfly to place second, 0.50 seconds behind first-place finisher Kate Douglass who set a new American record in the event. In the final of the 4×100 yard medley relay the following day, she contributed to winning the conference title with a 3:21.80, swimming the backstroke leg in 49.25 and helping set new US Open and NCAA records in the event. The fifth and final evening, she placed second in the final of the 100 yard freestyle with a time of 46.32 seconds. She concluded the Championships with a 46.41 on the lead-off leg of the 4×100 yard freestyle relay to help win the event and lower the US Open, American, and NCAA records in the event with a final time of 3:06.83.

2023 NCAA Championships

Commencing competition at the 2023 NCAA Division I Championships with the 4×50 yard medley relay, Walsh and her relay teammates won the NCAA title with American, US Open, and NCAA records of 1:31.51. On the second evening, she first won the silver medal in the 50 yard freestyle with a time of 20.85 seconds, then won a gold medal and NCAA title in the 4×50 yard freestyle relay, where she helped set a new Championships record of 1:24.51 by splitting a 20.59 for the second leg of the relay. In her first event of the third evening, she won her first 100 yard backstroke NCAA title with American, US Open, and NCAA record times of 48.26 seconds, which was a time drop of 0.74 seconds from her previous personal best time. She followed up with an NCAA title in the 4×100 yard medley relay, swimming the backstroke leg of the relay to contribute to a finish in 3:22.39.

On the fourth of four evenings, Walsh won the NCAA title for a second year-in-a-row in the 100 yard freestyle, finishing in a pool record and personal best time of 45.61 seconds, which was 0.05 seconds slower than the American record of 45.56 seconds set by Simone Manuel in 2017. She attained a sub-46 second time (45.85) on the anchor leg of the 4×100 yard freestyle relay to conclude the meet with another NCAA title in an American, US Open, and NCAA record time of 3:05.84 with relay teammates Kate Douglass, Alex Walsh, and Maxine Parker.

International championships

Personal best times

Long course meters (50 m pool)

Legend: h – prelims heat

Short course yards (25 yd pool)

World records

World junior records

Long course meters (50 m pool)

National records

Short course yards (25 yd pool)

Legend: NR – American record; US – US Open record

Awards and honors
 StyleBlueprint, Top 10 Most Popular Articles in Nashville for 2022 for an article covering the launch of her and her sister's clothing line.
 Swimming World, The Week That Was: October 18, 2021 (#1)
 Atlantic Coast Conference (ACC), Freshman of the Year (Women's): 2021–2022
 Atlantic Coast Conference (ACC), Swimmer of the Week (female): October 19, 2021, January 25, 2022, October 25, 2022, November 8, 2022, January 24, 2023
 Arena, Swim of the Week: January 28, 2022
 SwimSwam, Swammy Award, NCAA Freshman of the Year (Women's): 2022
 Swimming World Magazine, Cover Issue: Special Double Issue (May/June 2020, Vol. 61, No. 6)
 National Interscholastic Swimming Coaches Association (NISCA), All-American High School Swimmer: 2020–2021
 USA Swimming, Team USA Captain: 2019 World Junior Championships
 Swimming World, Up & Comers: September 6, 2016
 SwimSwam, Weekly Wonders of Age Group Swimming: August 5, 2015

See also
 List of junior world records in swimming
 List of people from Tennessee
 List of people from Nashville, Tennessee

References

External links
 

2003 births
Living people
Sportspeople from Nashville, Tennessee
American female freestyle swimmers
American female butterfly swimmers
Virginia Cavaliers women's swimmers
Swimmers from Tennessee
21st-century American women